Salomé de Bahia is a Brazilian vocalist, living in Paris, France.

De Bahia musical career started in 1958. She met Parisian DJ and producer Bob Sinclar in 1997 in Paris jazz cafe Chez Felix. De Bahia has gained wider popularity in 1998 when she started to cooperate with Bob Sinclar and they released the compilation Sun Sun on Sony records. She also adopted songs from Stevie Wonder's "Another Star", listed as "Outro Lugar", and Barry Manilow's "Copacabana". She is a versatile singer and sings in various musical genres like bossa nova, salsa, jazz and electronic music.

Discography

Albums 
 (2002) Cabaret - EastWest Records
 (2005) Brasil - Tommy Boy Entertainment

Singles & EPs 
 (1979) Jack, Jack, Jack/Red Balloon - Jupiter Records
 (1997) Bob Sinclar Feat. Salomé De Bahia - Eu So Quero Um Xodo (12", Ltd) - Columbia Records
 (1999) Outro Lugar - Yellow Productions
 (2001) Tormento de Amor - Yellow Productions
 (2002) Theme of Rio - Yellow Productions
 (2004) Taj Mahal - Yellow Productions
 (2005) Copacabana - Yellow Productions
 (2008) Prok & Fitch Present Salome de Bahia - Outro Lugar - Stealth records
 (2008) DJ Wady & Patrick M / Prok & Fitch Present Salomé De Bahia - Pacha Ibiza 2008/2 - Vendetta records

References 

Living people
1945 births